Wolfgang Mager (born 24 August 1952) is a retired German rower. He competed for East Germany, first in coxless pairs, together with Siegfried Brietzke, and then in coxless fours. In these events he won Olympic gold medals in 1972 and 1976, as well as four world championships in 1974–1979. In the 1980 Olympics, the East German boat won the gold medal again, but Mager suffered a hand injury before the Games and was replaced by Jürgen Thiele.

References 

1952 births
Living people
People from Kamenz
Olympic rowers of East Germany
Rowers at the 1972 Summer Olympics
Rowers at the 1976 Summer Olympics
Olympic gold medalists for East Germany
Olympic medalists in rowing
East German male rowers
World Rowing Championships medalists for East Germany
Medalists at the 1976 Summer Olympics
Medalists at the 1972 Summer Olympics
Sportspeople from Saxony